The 1999 Army Black Knights football team was an American football team that represented the United States Military Academy as a member of Conference USA (C-USA) in the 1999 NCAA Division I-A football season. In their ninth season under head coach Bob Sutton, the Black Knights compiled a 3–8 record and were outscored by their opponents by a combined total of 317 to 225. In the annual Army–Navy Game, the Black Knights lost to Navy, 19–9.

Schedule

Personnel

Season summary

vs Navy

100th meeting (75th in Philadelphia)
Roger Staubach, Joe Bellino, and Pete Dawkins appeared for the ceremonial coin toss

References

Army
Army Black Knights football seasons
Army Black Knights football